The UNESCO Prize for Girls’ and Women’s Education is an award, recognizing outstanding contributions to the advancement of female education. Supported by the Government of the People’s Republic of China, the Prize is conferred annually to two laureates. The prize awards USD 50,000 to each laureate to further their work in the area of girls’ and women’s education. Laureates are nominated by Member States, in consultation with their National Commissions, as well as non-governmental organizations in official partnership with UNESCO. They are recognized by UNESCO's Director General.

Background and purpose 
Gender equality in education is a basic right and a prerequisite to build inclusive societies. Although notable progress has been made over the last 20 years, 16 million girls will never set foot in a classroom.

Established in 2015 by UNESCO’s Executive Board, the UNESCO Prize rewards activities that are innovative, and/or have far reaching sustainable impact in advancing girls’ and women’s education. It is the first UNESCO Prize of this nature and showcases successful projects that improve and promote the educational prospects of girls and women. Following the first five-year cycle, the Government of the People’s Republic of China renewed its support to the UNESCO Prize for Girls and Women’s Education for another five-year cycle since 2021.

The Prize contributes to the attainment of the 2030 Sustainable Development agenda, particularly SDG goals 4 on education and 5 on gender equality. It also supports UNESCO’s global priorities included in the Medium-term Strategy 2014-2021 and the Gender Equality Action Plan 2014-2021 (GEAP II).

Nominations 
Nominations are made by Governments of UNESCO Members States via their Permanent Delegation to UNESCO, and Non-Governmental Organizations (NGOs) in official partnership with UNESCO. 

Nominations are assessed by an international Jury on the basis of a comprehensive selection criteria including (1) impact, (2) innovation and (3) sustainability. The selection of laureates is made by the UNESCO Director-General based on the recommendation of the International Jury.

Laureates

2016 
The two laureates of the first edition of the Prize were selected in 2016 by the Director-General of UNESCO, Irina Bokova, on the basis of recommendations by an International Jury of experts. The two outstanding projects selected in 2016 were the Female Students Network Trust from Zimbabwe and the Directorate of Early Childhood Education Development from Indonesia, who received their award at an official ceremony in June 2016.

2017 
The 2017 laureates included The Development and Education Programme for Daughters and Communities Center in the Greater Mekong Sub-Region (DEPDC/GMS) from Thailand and The Mini Academy of Science and Technology (MaCTec) from Peru. Both received their awards on the sidelines of the 9th BRICS Summit.

2018 
The 2018 laureates are the Misr El Kheir Foundation in Egypt and the Women’s Centre of Jamaica Foundation in Jamaica. Both have been awarded during a ceremony at UNESCO Headquarters on the International Day of the Girl 2018.

2019 
The 2019 laureates are Sulá Batsú from Costa Rica and the Department of Education of the Government of Navarre, Spain for their project SKOLAE.They received their rewards during a ceremony at UNESCO Headquarters on the International Day of the Girl 2019.

2020 

The 2020 laureates are the Shilpa Sayura Foundation in Sri Lanka and the Girl Child Network from Kenya. They have been recognized through an online campaign linked to the International Day of the Girl Child of 2020.

2021 
The 2021 laureates are Girl MOVE Academy from Mozambique and {reprograma} from Brazil. They were recognized during an online award ceremony on 15 October 2021, held as part of UNESCO’s celebration of International Day of the Girl.

2022 
The 2022 laureates are Room to Read from Cambodia for its Girls’ Education Programme and Girls Livelihood and Mentorship Initiative (GLAMI) from Tanzania. Both have been awarded the prize during a ceremony held at UNESCO Headquarters on 11 October, as part of UNESCO’s celebration of the 10th International Day of the Girl Child.

References

External links 
 UNESCO Prize for Girls’ and Women’s Education
 Education and gender equality
 Sri Lanka and Kenya laureates to receive 2020 UNESCO Prize for Girls’ and Women’s Education 

UNESCO awards
Education awards